"Lontano" is a song performed by Italian singer Francesca Michielin. It was written by Fortunato Zampaglione and produced by Michele Canova.  The song was released as a digital download on 25 September 2015 through Sony Music Entertainment Italy as the third single from her second studio album di20 (2015). The song peaked at number 99 on the Italian Singles Chart.

Music video
A music video to accompany the release of "Lontano" was first released onto YouTube on 2 October 2015 at a total length of three minutes and fourteen seconds. It was directed by Giacomo Triglia who also directed Michielin's two previous music videos, L'amore esiste and Battito di ciglia.

Track listing

Chart performance

Weekly charts

Release history

References

2015 songs
2015 singles
Francesca Michielin songs
Songs written by Fortunato Zampaglione
Sony Music singles
Song recordings produced by Michele Canova